A  is a general term for a float that is pulled or carried during a festival in Japan. They are often gorgeously decorated with flowers and dolls.

Strictly speaking, those that imitate the shape of a mountain or have a tree on top as a symbol of a mountain are classified as "", while those without such a shape and with a roof are called "".。But in reality the name is often standardized to one or the other regardless of the shape for each festival.

Another name for floats 
It is called in various ways depending on the region.

Yama no tsukemono 

 Yamahama (mountain, float, obstacle), Hikiyama (pulling mountain, towing mountain), Kakiyama (carrying mountain, carrying mountain).
 Yamaboko (Yamaboko). A float with a structure in the shape of a mountain on a stand, and a Hoko yari or long sword.。From the legend that evil gods are attracted to shiny things like spears.。
 Yamakasa (Yamakasa) (Northern Kyushu region)
 Yatai (floats) (Shinjo City, Yamagata Prefecture, Mogami region)

Things with cars (except the above) 

 Danjiri (Jidaijiri, Daijiri, Danjiri, Kururaku, Danjiri)）(Kinki region, China region, Shikoku region)
 Saisha (festival car) (Mie Prefecture, Kuwana City region)
 Okuruma (carts) from the Chita Region and Owari regions.

Kasabo (kasa) (excluding the above) 

 Kasaboko (Kasaboko) (Chichibu region, etc.)
 Okasa' (Wakayama Prefecture Tanabe City)

Objects of the platform 

 Yatai (food stalls) (mainly in Chubu region such as Nagano Prefecture, Shizuoka Prefecture, Enshu, Gifu Prefecture, Hida, Kanagawa Prefecture), Odawara City and Hyōgo Prefecture, the Harima region, Iwate Prefecture, inland and coastal inland regions.)
 Taiko-dai (drum stands) (mainly in the Setouchi Prefecture, including Niihama City, Saijo City, Yao City, Osaka Prefecture, and Sakai City in Ehime Prefecture)
  (There were Daigaku throughout the southern part of Osaka City before the war, but as of 2015, there are only two at Ikune Shrine.)

The word dashi is derived from two theories: one is that it is a display outside the temple or precincts, and the other is that it is a display of Yorishiro, the beard basket. The word "yama" refers to all kinds of floats, but the word "kuruma" is often used to refer to hikiyama.

Mountain (the original form of a float) 
A mountain is a substitute made to resemble a natural mountain and is used in festivals. The original form of a float.

In the ancient Folk belief, there was a belief that gods descended from the heavens using rocks and trees on mountains and mountaintops as substitutes. These remain as Mountain worship or Shinto shrines with mountains as Shintai. A typical example is Okami Shrine (Mt. Miwa). Even small shrines located at the foot of a mountain often have a Iwakura or Shinboku at the top.

As villages developed, rituals began to be held in the plains, and temporary shrines were established. At this time, a yorishiro was also set up to pray for the coming of the gods, and this became permanent, resulting in the establishment of facilities such as today's shrines. One of these substitutes is a mountain (yama, tsukuri yama or decorative yama) built to resemble a mountain. In addition to the permanent reliquaries inside the temples, these mountains came to be used at festivals as temporary reliquaries to express or reaffirm the descent of the gods. Originally, the mountain was actually built and prayed on, but later the altar came to be regarded as the mountain.

The first recorded mountain is "Mt. Aoba" in the article of Taruhito in Kojiki, where it is said that Kibisatsumi, the ancestor of the Izumo Kunizukuri, built a mountain decorated with green leaves as a garden to enshrine Okuninushi.

A rare example that retains the original meaning is the "Karasuyama no Yamaage event" (commonly known as "Yamaage Matsuri", a national List of Important Intangible Folk Cultural Properties) in Tochigi Prefecture Nasu Karasuyama City.Originally, the festival involved the construction and dedication of an earthen mound in the town, but with the rise of the economy, the local specialty washi paper (Chomura-gami) was used to attach the mound to a frame made of wood and bamboo.The largest of these is 7 meters wide (the full width of the road) and over 10 meters high. At present, several floats and stage sets are combined over a depth of 100 meters, and entertainment (such as Kyogen and Kagura) is dedicated to the floats. These floats are paraded through the town just like other floats in other places. All of the floats are handmade, 7m wide, 10m high, and 100m deep, and the stage sets are assembled each time, entertained, dismantled, and moved up to 6 times a day, or 18 times in a 3-day festival. The waterfalls are painted on all of the mountains, in the hope that the blessings of the mountains will spread to all of the towns. Until the early Showa period (1926–1989), the mountains were burned at each festival and the ashes were given away as good luck charms.

The first mountain to be recorded as a form of ritual object is "Shirushi-no-Yama", which was pulled up for the Nimei-tennō's Great Lenten Festival in the 10th year of the Tenchō (833), November Boshin-jō in the Chiku Nihon Kouki. (Shirushi-no-yama, Hyo-no-yama, Shime-yama), which was pulled during the Emperor Ninmyō It is said to be the original form of a float, with a role similar to that of a mobile shrine. There was a time when the festival was suspended, and the Shibeyama seems to have been abolished at that time.

The same type of floats appeared in folk festivals, and they were called "yokiyama," a type of float temporarily built like an altar, "hikiyama," a type of float pulled, and "kakiyama," a type of float carried. In the current festival, there are only a few floats that are not paraded, and most of them are paraded.

[The Hozutsu Hachimangu Shrine in Toyama Prefecture and the Futagami Imizu Shrine in Takaoka City still perform the Tsukiyama event, a form of ancient worship. Although the origins of the Tsukiyama ritual are not well known, it is known that the Tsukiyama ritual at Hojozu Hachimangu Shrine has been performed since the early Edo period, according to 1721 (Kyōho in 1721 and "Tsukiyama Kooro Denki".

A temporary Tsukiyama (Altar) is set up in front of a large pine tree at Hōyūzu Hachimangu Shrine and three large cedar trees at Futagami Sagami Shrine to welcome the gods. Both mounts have a two-tiered altar, and the lower tier has two masks, one for each of the Four Heavenly Kings (Dhṛtarāṣṭra, Virūḍhaka (Heavenly King), Virūpākṣa, and Vaiśravaṇa), with a Karahafu-roofed temple (Hokora) in the center of the upper row. Hokora) in the center of the upper tier is a Karahafu roofed temple (Shrine). After the rituals are over, the mounds are dismantled in a great hurry according to the legend that each God is said to go berserk.

This event was also held at the Isurugihiko Shrine on Ishidōzan in Noto, but was discontinued during the Meiji period. In Toyama Prefecture, the ceremony is performed only at Hōyūtsu Hachimangu Shrine and Futagami-Imizu Shrine, which was suspended in the Meiji period and revived in 1956 (Showa 31). This is a rare event in Japan. Because of the appearance of the three main deities, it has been called "legless" in Houzu, "handless" in Futagamiyama, and "mouthless" in Ishidouyama.

Danjiri 
The word "yama" includes "hikiyama" and "kakiyama," and also includes "yama (yakiyama)" in terms of its reading. The most common type is "hikiyama" with wheels, and other types include "kakiyama" with a paddle. The names of the floats are as mentioned above, but it is very complicated because the same floats are called differently in different regions, and the same name is sometimes used for different floats.

More and more floats are being paraded as a style of entertainment, and a variety of floats exist all over Japan. Many of them have lost their role as a substitute, but there are vestiges such as children or Dolls riding on them, or items used as substitutes are decorated on them.

Structure 
Depending on the region or district, there are many types of bogies with wheels inside or outside the bogie, wheels made of wood or metal, wheel size, and the way the wood of the bogie body is assembled.

 Wheel

The most common type of wheel is the four-wheeled one. There are two types of wheel: the yaguruma (spoked wheel) and itaguruma (board wheel) of the outer wheel style, and the inner wheel style. Some of them have lacquered or carved wheels, and some of them have auxiliary wheels. [The floats used in the Otsu Festival in Shiga Prefecture and the Ishidori Matsuri in northern Mie Prefecture are three-wheeled, while those used in the Shizuoka, two-wheeled floats pulled in central and eastern Enshu from Mori-cho to Iwata City, six-wheeled floats such as Hamasaki Gion Yamakasa, and Toyama Prefecture Some have six wheels, such as the Hamasaki Gion Yamakasa, while others are sleigh-shaped without wheels, such as the Tatemon Festival in Uozu City. There are also different ways and forms of operation. In Ogi Gion, logs were laid one after another underneath the mountain without wheels, which was an unusual way of operating the festival, but now it is just a hikiyama with wheels.

 Power and means of transportation

In most cases, the floats are operated by human power. In rare cases, the floats are pulled by trucks, or the floats themselves are powered, but this is a special case.

 Hikiyama (pulled mountain)

Some of the floats have very elaborate Karakuri puppets and vary in size from the size of an ordinary Mikoshi to more than ten times that size (weighing several tons). Among them, the hikiyama (big mountain) of the Aokashiwa Festival in Nanao City, Ishikawa Prefecture, weighs about 20 tons and is said to be the largest in Japan. The reason for the creation of large floats is that they can be operated in a huge size due to the form of pulling, the remnants of the use of taller floats as a substitute, and competition between shrine parishioners as a style.

 Two-wheeled floats

A yatai is a float pulled by two wheels. Famous festivals include the Murakami Festival, the Enshu Yokosuka Mikumano Shrine Festival, and the Kakegawa Festival.

Flower cart

This refers to all kinds of floats decorated with paper flowers and other floral decorations.
In the Ofunato Festival, paper called "Ohana" is used to decorate the carts with gold and silver. All of these are used to fund the reconstruction of the shrine and the Community Center.

The ceremony was held at the Kaki-yama for carrying.

This type of float is rare in Japan, and most of them weigh from a few hundred kilograms to about one or two tons at the heaviest. They are often confused with mikoshi (portable shrines), but they are classified as floats because of their nature as accompaniments to the Ujiko. One of the most famous is the Hakata Gion Yamakasa.

Floats designated as Important Tangible Folk Cultural Properties 
Of the festivals (events) still held throughout Japan, a total of 66 floats pulled at the following five festivals have been designated as Important Tangible Folk Cultural Properties.

All of the festivals in which they are pulled are listed on the List of Important Intangible Folk Cultural Properties and on the Intangible cultural heritage of UNESCO. Intangible cultural heritage of UNESCO (see also the following section for more information on the festivals that have received this designation). The following list includes floats that are not called "floats".

 Hitachi Furyumono: 1 float – Designated on 6 May 1959 (Ibaraki Prefecture)
 23 stalls of Takayama Festival – designated on 9 June 1960 (Gifu Prefecture)
 Takaoka Mikurayama Festival 7 floats – designated on 9 June 1960 (Toyama Prefecture)
 Gion Matsuri 29 floats – designated on 23 May 1962 (Kyoto Prefecture)
 Chichibu Night Festival 6 stalls – Designated on 23 May 1962 (Saitama Prefecture)

The Parade of Floats

List of major festivals in which floats are used 
The following list includes festivals that are not called "floats".

Hokkaido 

 Hokkaido Jingu Grand Festival – Ishikari Promotion Bureau
 Hiyama Promotion Bureau
 Nezaki Shrine Festival – Toshimane Subprefecture
 Makomanai Shrine Grand Festival – Hiyama Promotion Bureau
 Kaminokuni Hachimangu Ferry Festival – Hiyama Promotion Bureau
 Otobe Hachiman Shrine Grand Festival – Hiyama Promotion Bureau
 Yakumo Float Parade – Watoshima General Promotion Bureau
 Shari Shimotsuko Nebuta – Okhotsk General Promotion Bureau
 Numata Town Yotaka Andon Festival – Sorachi General Promotion Bureau

Tohoku Region 

 Aomori Nebuta – Aomori Prefecture
 Hirosaki Neputa – Aomori, Japan
 Goshogawara Tachineputa – Aomori, Japan
 Kuroishi Neputa – Aomori Prefecture
 Tanabe Festival – Aomori Prefecture
 Kawauchi Hachimangu Shrine Festival – Aomori Prefecture
 Yanemori Hachimangu Shrine Festival – Aomori Prefecture
 Wakinosawa Hachimangu Shrine Festival – Aomori Prefecture
 Ohata Festival – Aomori Prefecture
 Parade of floats at Kazamaura – Aomori, Japan
 Ajigasawa Shiro Hachimangu Shrine Grand Festival – Aomori, Japan
 Okudo's float event – Aomori pref.
 Oma's float event – Aomori, Japan
 Hachinohe Sanja Taisai – Aomori, Japan
 Hachinohe Sansha Taisai – Aomori Prefecture
 Kakunodate Festival – Akita Prefecture
 Tsuchizaki Shinmeisha Festival's Hikiyama Event – Akita, Japan
 Hanawa Bayashi – Akita Prefecture
 Morioka Autumn Festival (Morioka floats) – Iwate Prefecture
 Hanamaki Festival – Iwate Prefecture
 Ichinohe Festival – Iwate Prefecture
 Ninohe Festival – Iwate Prefecture
 Hidaka Fire Prevention Festival – Iwate Prefecture
 Morimachi Five Year Festival – Iwate Prefecture
 Kurikoma Yamatsuri Festival – Miyagi Prefecture
 Shinjō Matsuri – Yamagata Prefecture
 Renryu floats (associated with the Fukushima Inari Shrine Festival) – Fukushima Prefecture
 Nihomatsu Lantern Festival – Fukushima, Japan
 Aizu Tajima Gion Festival – Fukushima Prefecture

Kanto Region 

 Hitachi Kokusai Shrine Grand Festival – Ibaraki, Japan
 Shiogai Gion Festival – Ibaraki, Japan
 Hitachi Furyumono (performed at the Hitachi Sakura Festival in spring) – Ibaraki Prefecture, Japan.
 Hitachi Furyumono (performed at the Spring Hitachi Sakura Festival) – Ibaraki Prefecture
 Kanuma Autumn Festival (Yatai event at Kanuma Imamiya Shrine Festival) – Tochigi Prefecture
 Tochigi Autumn Festival – Tochigi Prefecture
 Yamaage Matsuri (Yama [original form of float]) – Tochigi Prefecture
 Shibukawa Yamashiro Festival – Gunma Prefecture
 Oniishi Summer Festival – Gunma Prefecture
 Fujioka Festival – Gunma Prefecture
 Kawagoe Festival – Saitama Prefecture
 Chichibu Night Festival – Saitama Prefecture.
 Kumagaya Uchiwa Festival – Saitama Prefecture
 Kuki lantern festival, Tenno-sama – Saitama, Japan
 Sawara Grand Festival – Chiba Prefecture
 Narita Gion Festival – Chiba Prefecture
 Akasaka Hikawa Festival – Tokyo, Japan
 Kurayami Festival – Tokyo, Japan
 Hachioji Festival – Tokyo
 Ome Grand Festival – Tokyo
 Oume Grand Festival – Tokyo * Kodai Jingu Grand Festival – Kanagawa
 Tenno Festival – Kanagawa Prefecture
 Matsubara Shrine Grand Festival, Soga Shrine Grand Festival, etc. (Manto-type stalls at various locations in Odawara) – Kanagawa Prefecture

Chubu Region 

 Joetsu Festival (Naoetsu Gion Festival) – Niigata Prefecture
 Murakami Grand Festival – Niigata Prefecture
 Senami Grand Festival – Niigata Prefecture
 Iwafune Grand Festival – Niigata Prefecture
 Nakajo Festival – Niigata Prefecture
 Castle Town Shinhatsuta Furusato Festival (Shinhatsuta Dairin) – Niigata Prefecture
 Niitsu Summer Festival – Niigata Prefecture
 Takaoka Mikurayama Festival – Toyama Prefecture
 Johata Hikiyama Festival – Toyama Prefecture
 Tatemon Festival – Toyama Prefecture
 Fukuno Yodaka Festival – Toyama Prefecture
 Tonami Yotaka Andon Festival – Toyama Prefecture
 Tonami Night High Festival – Toyama Prefecture
 Shokawa Tourism Festival (Shokawa Night High Andon) – Toyama Prefecture
 Ecchu Yatsuo Hikiyama Festival – Toyama Prefecture
 Demachi Children's Kabuki Hikiyama Festival – Toyama Prefecture
 Houzu (Shinminato) Hikiyama Festival – Toyama Prefecture
 Takasagayama Gannenbo Festival – Toyama Prefecture
 Ebie Hikiyama Festival – Toyama Prefecture
 Daimon Hikiyama Festival – Toyama Prefecture
 Fushiki Hikiyama Festival – Toyama Prefecture
 Ishido Hikiyama Festival – Toyama Prefecture
 Iwase Hikiyama Car Festival – Toyama Prefecture
 Himi Gion Festival – Toyama Prefecture
 Shikata Children's Hikiyama Festival – Toyama Prefecture
 Usa Hachimangu Shrine Spring Festival – Toyama Prefecture
 Yoyasa Festival – Toyama Prefecture
 Aoba Festival – Ishikawa Prefecture
 Otabimatsuri Festival – Ishikawa Prefecture
 Abare Festival – Ishikawa Prefecture
 Iida Toronoyama Festival – Ishikawa Prefecture
 Okaeri Festival – Ishikawa Prefecture
 Hourai Festival – Ishikawa Prefecture
 Kuroshima Tenryo Festival – Ishikawa Prefecture
 Hikiyama Festival in Ujima – Ishikawa Prefecture
 Suzu Deca Hikiyama Festival – Ishikawa Prefecture
 Maenami Hikiyama Festival – Ishikawa Prefecture
 Sumiyoshi Grand Festival – Ishikawa Prefecture
 Mikuni Festival – Fukui Prefecture
 Tsuruga Festival – Fukui Prefecture
 Kohama Hozai Festival – Fukui Prefecture
 Takahama Seven Year Festival – Fukui Prefecture
 Nagano Gion Festival – Nagano, Japan
 Hotaka Shrine Mifune Festival – Nagano, Japan
 Aree Shrine Grand Festival – Nagano, Japan
 Wakaichi Oji Shrine Grand Festival – Nagano, Japan
 Takayama Festival – Gifu Prefecture
 Furukawa Festival – Gifu Prefecture
 Ogaki Festival – Gifu Prefecture
 Takehana Festival – Gifu Prefecture
 Mino Festival – Gifu Prefecture
 Ibi Festival – Gifu Prefecture
 Tarui Hikiyama Festival – Gifu Prefecture
 Gifu Festival (Inaha Shrine Festival) – Gifu Prefecture
 Seki Festival – Gifu Prefecture
 Ayano Festival – Gifu Prefecture
 Takada Festival – Gifu Prefecture
 Murohara Festival – Gifu Prefecture
 Mitake Yakushi Festival – Gifu Prefecture
 Kutami Festival – Gifu Prefecture
 Yaotsu Festival (Yaotsu Danjiri Festival) – Gifu Prefecture
 Fujinomiya Autumn Festival – Shizuoka Prefecture
 Fujieda Grand Festival – Shizuoka Prefecture
 Kanaya Tea Festival – Shizuoka Prefecture
 Jito Hachimangu Shrine Grand Festival – Shizuoka Prefecture
 Kakegawa Festival – Shizuoka Prefecture
 Enshu Yokosuka Mikumano Shrine Grand Festival – Shizuoka Prefecture
 Yasaka Shrine Gion Festival – Shizuoka Prefecture
 Yamanashi Gion Festival – Shizuoka Prefecture
 Iida Yamana Shrine Tenno Festival – Shizuoka Prefecture
 Fukuroi Festival – Shizuoka Prefecture
 Mori Festival – Shizuoka Prefecture
 Fu Hachimangu Shrine Festival – Shizuoka Prefecture
 Kaketsuka Kibune Shrine Festival – Shizuoka Prefecture
 Hamamatsu Kite Festival – Shizuoka Prefecture
 Ohari Tsushima Tenno Festival (River Festival) – Aichi Prefecture
 Kamezaki Tidal Basin Festival – Aichi Prefecture, Japan
 Asuke Hachimangu Shrine Festival – Aichi Prefecture
 West Biwajima Festival – Aichi, Japan
 Komaki Akiba Festival – Aichi prefecture, Japan
 Inuyama Festival – Aichi Prefecture
 Ishinata Festival – Aichi Prefecture
 Nagoya Festival – Aichi Prefecture
 Narumi Festival – Aichi, Japan
 Tsutsui-machi Dekicho Tenno Festival – Aichi prefecture, Japan
 Omori Tenno Festival – Aichi Prefecture
 Tokoname Area Festival – Aichi prefecture, Japan
 Ono Area Festival – Aichi prefecture, Japan
 Nishinokuchi Area Festival – Aichi prefecture
 Ogura Area Festival – Aichi prefecture
 Yada Area Festival – Aichi prefecture
 Taya Area Festival-Aichi prefecture
 Furuba Area Festival-Aichi Prefecture
 Tarumizu district festival (from 2020) – Aichi prefecture
 Otani Area Festival-Aichi Prefecture
 Sakai Area Festival – Aichi prefecture
 Handa Float Festival – Aichi prefecture
 Otogawa Festival – Aichi prefecture
 Iwoname Area Festival – Aichi prefecture
 Iwaname-Shinden Area Festival-Aichi Prefecture
 Nariwa Area Festival-Aichi Prefecture
 Kyowa Area Festival – Aichi prefecture
 Kamihanda Area Festival – Aichi prefecture
 Shimohanda Area Festival-Aichi Prefecture
 Itayama Area Festival-Aichi prefecture
 Nishinariwa Area Festival-Aichi Prefecture
 Kamezaki Community Float Festival-Aichi Prefecture
 Zuiho District Summer Festival-Aichi Prefecture
 Kita Ward Summer Festival-Aichi Prefecture
 Otogawa Gion Summer Festival – Aichi Prefecture
 Chiryu Festival – Aichi Prefecture
 Nomi Shinmyougu Grand Festival – Aichi Prefecture
 Yahagi Shrine Autumn Festival – Aichi prefecture
 Suga Shrine Grand Festival – Aichi Prefecture
 Mitani Festival – Aichi Prefecture
 Koyo Festival – Aichi prefecture, Japan
 Sunari Festival – Aichi Prefecture
 Owari Yokosuka Festival – Aichi Prefecture
 Ota Festival – Aichi Prefecture
 Owari Tsushima Autumn Festival – Aichi prefecture, Japan
 Tahara Festival – Aichi Prefecture
 Honchi Festival – Aichi Prefecture

Kinki Region 

 Ishidori Matsuri – Mie Prefecture
 Yokkaichi Festival – Mie Prefecture
 Ueno Tenjin Festival – Mie Prefecture
 Whale Boat Event at Toride Shrine – Mie Prefecture
 Nagahama Hikiyama Festival – Shiga Prefecture
 Otsu Festival – Shiga Prefecture
 Mizuguchi Hikiyama Festival – Shiga Prefecture
 Hino Festival – Shiga Prefecture
 Omizo Festival – Shiga Prefecture
 Maibara Hikiyama Festival – Shiga Prefecture
 Chawan Festival – Shiga Prefecture
 Miyaso's Hikiyama Festival (Goka Festival) – Shiga Prefecture
 Hikiyama Festival in Kenai – Shiga Prefecture
 Gion Festival in Asakoi – Shiga Prefecture
 Gion Festival – Kyoto Prefecture
 Kameoka Festival – Kyoto Prefecture
 Kaetsuya Festival – Kyoto Prefecture
 Mikawachi Hikiyama Festival – Kyoto Prefecture
 Nukata no Dashi event – Kyoto Prefecture
 Kishiwada Danjiri Festival – Osaka Prefecture
 Tsukuno Danjiri Festival - Osaka Prefecture
 Tanabe Festival – Wakayama Prefecture
 Nada no Kenka Matsuri – Hyogo Prefecture

Chugoku and Shikoku Region 

 Tsuyama Festival – Okayama Prefecture
 Katsuyama Festival – Okayama Prefecture
 Kuze Festival – Okayama Prefecture
 Konohachimangu Shrine Grand Festival – Okayama Prefecture
 Ushimado Autumn Festival – Okayama Prefecture
 Toyohama Chosa Festival – Kagawa Prefecture
 Saijo Festival – Ehime Prefecture
 Niihama Taiko Matsuri (Niihama Drum Festival) – Ehime Prefecture (Three major festivals in Shikoku and three major fighting festivals in Japan)

Kyushu Region 

 Hakata Gion Yamakasa – Fukuoka, Japan
 Daijayama Festival – Fukuoka Prefecture
 Hakata Okunchi – Fukuoka, Japan
 Nagasaki Kunchi – Nagasaki, Japan
 Karatsu Kunchi – Saga Prefecture, Japan
 Yatsushiro Myoken Matsuri – Kumamoto Prefecture
 Hita Gion Festival – Oita Prefecture
 Nakatsu Gion Festival – Oita Prefecture
 Usuki Gion Festival – Oita Prefecture
 Fuchu Senshigami – Oita Prefecture

Float festivals designated as Important Intangible Folk Cultural Properties and registered as Intangible Cultural Heritage 
Among the festivals that are still held in Japan, there are 40 float festivals (festivals with floats as the main part of the festival) that are designated as Important Intangible Folk Cultural Properties by the government. Gion Matsuri and Hitachi Kaze Matsuri. Two of them, the Gion Matsuri and the Hitachi Furyumono, were inscribed on the UNESCO list of Intangible cultural heritage in 2009 (Heisei 21), but the Agency for Cultural Affairs announced on 13 March 2014 that it would propose to register all 32 festivals designated as Important Intangible Folk Cultural Properties, including the above two, as "Yamaboko-Yatai Events" in 2015 (Heisei 27). 13 March 2014.、On 27 March of the same year, we decided to formally apply for registration, and the earliest we could expect to hear whether or not it would be approved was in the fall of 2015 (Heisei 27).、The application for registration was submitted on 4 June, and since 61 applications for registration were received from various countries, UNESCO informed us that the registration review will take place in the fall of 2016. Later, the "Oogaki Festival Shido Event (Ogaki Festival)" was designated as an Important Intangible Folk Cultural Property on 2 March 2015 (Heisei 27).、It was also added to UNESCO's Intangible Cultural Heritage list, bringing the total to 33.

On 31 October 2016 (Heisei 28), UNESCO's subsidiary organization issued a recommendation for the registration of 33 items in 18 prefectures.、It was registered on 1 December of the same year.

Festivals marked with an asterisk (*) are those registered as UNESCO Intangible Cultural Heritage "Yamaboko-Yatai Events" (33 events) 

 Tohoku Region
 Hachinohe Sanja Grand Festival's float events – Aomori *
 Nebuta of Aomori – Aomori Prefecture
 Neputa of Hirosaki – Aomori Prefecture
 Kakunodate Festival Mountain Event – Akita *
 Hikiyama event of Tsuchizaki Shinmeisha Festival – Akita *
 Hanawa Festival's Yatai Event – Akita * * Shinjo Festival's Yatai Event – Akita
 Shinjo Festival floats – Yamagata * * [[Aizu Tajima Festival
 Tajima Gion Festival's Otoya Events – Fukushima Prefecture

 Kanto Region.
 Hitachi Furemono – Ibaraki Prefecture *
 Mifune Festival in Hitachi-Otsu – Ibaraki Prefecture
 Karasuyama Yamagage Event – Tochigi *
 Yatai event at Kanuma Imamiya Shrine Festival – Tochigi *
 Chichibu Festival Yatai Events and Kagura – Saitama *
 Kawagoe Hikawa Festival floats – Saitama *
 Sawara floats – Chiba * * [[Kawagoe floats

Chubu region
 Murakami Grand Festival – Niigata Prefecture
 Takaoka Mikurayama Matsuri no Mikurayama Event – Toyama Prefecture *
 Tatemon Event in Uozu – Toyama Prefecture *
 Hikiyama Event of Kiyohata Shinmyougu Festival – Toyama Prefecture *
 Hozozu Hachimangu Festival's Hikiyama and Tsukiyama Events – Toyama Prefecture
 Seikaku Matsuri no Hikiyama Event – Ishikawa *
 Takayama Matsuri no Yatai Event – Gifu Prefecture *
 Oshidaiko and Yatai Events of Furukawa Matsuri – Gifu Prefecture * * Ogaki Matsuri – Gifu Prefecture
 Ogaki Matsuri no Shido Event – Gifu Prefecture
 Owari Tsushima Tenno Festival's Shuraku Boat Event – Aichi Prefecture *
 Chiryu's Float Bunraku and Karakuri – Aichi prefecture *
 Inuyama Festival's Kuruma-yama Event – Aichi prefecture *
 Kamezaki Shioboshi Festival's Float Events – Aichi prefecture *
 Sunari Matsuri's Kuragura Boat Event and Miyoshi Nagashi – Aichi Prefecture

 Kanto Region
 Whale Boat Event at Toride Shrine – Mie * * [[Ueno Tenjin Festival
 Danjiri Event of Ueno Tenjin Festival – Mie * ; Kinki Region
 Miyuana Ishitori Matsuri's Festival Car Event – Mie * * [[Nagahama Hikiyama Festival
 Nagahama Hikiyama Festival's Hikiyama Events – Shiga * * Tenmiko Shrine## – Mie Prefecture * Tenmiko Shrine# – Mie Prefecture
 Hikiyama Event of Otsu Festival – Shiga Prefecture
 Gion Festival in Kyoto – Kyoto Prefecture
Kyushu Region
 Hakata Gion Yamakasa Events – Fukuoka Prefecture *
 Tobata Gion Oyamagasa Event – Fukuoka *
 Karatsu Kunchi Hikiyama Event – Saga Prefecture *
 Yatsushiro Myoken Matsuri Shinko Event – Kumamoto * * [[Hita Gion Festival
 Hita Gion Hikiyama Event – Oita * * Hita Gion Hikiyama Event – Oita

The Three Great Hikiyama Festivals (The Three Great Beauty Festivals)
 
 Chichibu Night Festival (Chichibu City, Saitama Prefecture)
 Gion Festival (Kyoto, Kyoto Prefecture)
 Takayama Festival (Takayama City, Gifu Prefecture)

Gallery

See also 

 Float (parade)
 Seki-juku (Tōkaidō)
 List of Important Intangible Folk Cultural Properties
 Intangible cultural heritage

References

References 

 "Hikiyama in Shinminato" (Shinminato, Toyama Board of education) published in October 1981.
 "Takaoka Mikurayama" (Takaoka City Board of Education) 2000, published on 31 March 2000.

External links 

 Yama, Hoko, Yatai, float festivals in Japan – UNESCO World Intangible Cultural Heritage "Yamaboko Yatai Event" Explanation and Video (English)

Folklore studies
Annual events in Japan
Festivals in Japan
Japanese culture
Shinto
Pages with unreviewed translations